Brian Hill is an American chef who was a contestant on the first season of the television show Top Chef.  He has appeared on Bar Rescue, and Hill was one of the six regular chefs in the Food Network reality show Private Chefs of Beverly Hills. In March 2010, he launched the Comfort Truck in Los Angeles, California.

References and notes

External links 
 iamchefbrian.com Official Chef Brian Website
 Biography of Brian Hill at All-American Speakers
 

Top Chef contestants
Living people
Participants in American reality television series
American chefs
American male chefs
Year of birth missing (living people)
Chefs from Los Angeles